The 1923 Illinois Fighting Illini football team was an American football team that represented the University of Illinois during the 1923 Big Ten Conference football season. In their 11th season under head coach Robert Zuppke, the Fighting Illini compiled an 8–0 record (5–0 against Big Ten Conference opponents), tied with Michigan for the Big Ten championship, shut out five of eight opponents, and outscored their opponents by a total of 136 to 20.

There was no contemporaneous system in 1923 for determining a national champion. However, Illinois was retroactively named as the national champion by the Boand System, College Football Researchers Association, Helms Athletic Foundation, and Parke H. Davis, and as a co-national champion by the Berryman QPRS system, National Championship Foundation, and Jeff Sagarin (using the ELO-Chess methodology).

Halfback Red Grange, known as "The Galloping Ghost", tallied 723 rushing yards and scored 12 touchdowns in seven games. In 2008, Grange was named by ESPN as the best college football player of all time. He was also a charter member of both the College and Pro Football Halls of Fame.

Grange and Guard Jim McMillen were consensus first-team picks on the 1923 All-America college football team. McMillen was also the team captain.

This was the first season for the Fighting Illini at Memorial Stadium, where the team plays their home games to this day.

Schedule

Roster

Head Coach: Robert Zuppke (11th year at Illinois)

Awards and honors
The following Illinois players received honors on the 1923 All-America college football team and/or the 1923 All-Big Ten Conference football team:
 Halfback Red Grange
 Consensus first-team All-American
 First-team All-Big Ten selection by Norman E. Brown and Walter Eckersall
 Guard Jim McMillen
 Consensus first-team All-American
 First-team All-Big Ten selection by Brown and Eckersall
 End Frank Rokusek
 Second-team All-American selected by Lawrence Perry
 Second-team All-Big Ten selection by Brown and Eckersall
 Quarterback Harry A. Hall
 Second-team All-Big Ten selection by Eckersall
 Fullback Earl Britton
 Second-team All-Big Ten selection by Brown and third-team selection by Eckersall

References

Illinois
Illinois Fighting Illini football seasons
College football national champions
Big Ten Conference football champion seasons
1923 Illinois Fighting Illini football